Disney Golf, known in Japan as , is a Disney sports game developed by T&E SOFT and the spiritual successor to Swing Away Golf, which was also developed by T&E Soft. The game is similar to Mario Golf, even though some animations are different from those in Mario Golf: Toadstool Tour. It was released in Japan by Capcom on May 30, 2002. A localised version by Disney Interactive and Electronic Arts was shown at the Electronic Entertainment Expo in the same year and was eventually released in North America in October, and later in Europe in December, locally distributed by Electronic Arts in the country and published by Disney Interactive. It was later re-released in Europe in 2005 with distribution done through Disney, alongside other games. It was the fifth golf game to be made for the system.

The game features nine characters to play as or against on a choice of six different courses. The characters are Donald Duck, Goofy, Minnie Mouse, Morty Mouse, Mortimer Mouse, Daisy Duck, Pete, Ludwig Von Drake, and Max. The six fictitious courses include American, Western, Mountain, Tropical, European, and the special Sky Course. Players can also earn tokens while on the links by achieving long putts, perfect swings, and chip-ins, which the tokens can be spent on one of 62 items. The game is unusual for the fact that Mickey Mouse is not playable unlike other Disney games, rather he is the golf caddy. One of Mickey's twin nephews who originated in comics, Morty Mouse, is playable in his place.

Development
In March 2002, a Japanese retailer reported that Capcom released pre-ordered information for the Japanese version of the game to ship to markets in Japan on May 30, 2002. Capcom stayed out of the character-based golf realm (presently dominated by Sony's Everybody's Golf and Camelot's Mario Golf), but Disney Golf would naturally have the cachet of its license to carry it.

First shown to the United States with little fanfare at the 2002 Electronic Entertainment Expo by Swing Away Golf developer T&E Soft, Disney Golf was aimed at casual sports fans of all ages and was the fifth golf game to be made for the PlayStation 2.

Reception

The game received "average" reviews according to the review aggregation website Metacritic. In Japan, Famitsu gave it a score of 30 out of 40.

References

External links

2002 video games
Capcom games
Donald Duck video games
Electronic Arts games
Golf video games
Goofy (Disney) video games
Mickey Mouse video games
Multiplayer and single-player video games
PlayStation 2 games
PlayStation 2-only games
T&E Soft games
Video games developed in Japan